Dicranomyia is a genus of crane fly in the family Limoniidae. Larvae are mostly aquatic or semi-aquatic, with an exception found in a single Hawaiian Islands species which has a leaf-mining larva.

Species

Subgenus Alexandriaria Garrett, 1922
D. phalangioides (Alexander, 1943)
D. suffusca (Garrett, 1922)
D. whartoni Needham, 1908
Subgenus Caenoglochina Alexander, 1964
D. acuminata Alexander, 1921
D. apicata Alexander, 1914
D. basistylata (Alexander, 1928)
D. capitonius (Alexander, 1945)
D. egae Alexander, 1921
D. fieldi (Alexander, 1967)
D. hoffmani (Alexander, 1927)
D. lotax (Alexander, 1971)
D. myctera (Alexander, 1967)
D. napoensis Alexander, 1921
D. paniculata (Byers, 1981)
D. paucilobata (Alexander, 1940)
D. pugnax (Alexander, 1946)
D. rapax Alexander, 1921
D. rogersiana Alexander, 1926
D. scaenalis (Alexander, 1951)
D. sica (Alexander, 1941)
D. singularis (Alexander, 1944)
D. somnifica (Alexander, 1943)
D. subacuminata (Alexander, 1967)
D. vorax (Alexander, 1941)
D. wirthiana (Alexander, 1970)
Subgenus Caenolimonia Alexander, 1967
D. amaryllis (Alexander, 1944)
D. angustiviria (Alexander, 1979)
D. brachycantha (Alexander, 1945)
D. combostena (Alexander, 1967)
D. contradistincta (Alexander, 1936)
D. curvispinosa (Alexander, 1979)
D. distantia (Alexander, 1971)
D. galbipes (Alexander, 1967)
D. interstitialis (Alexander, 1940)
D. meconeura (Alexander, 1962)
D. melaxantha (Alexander, 1934)
D. meridensis (Alexander, 1940)
D. neorepanda (Alexander, 1964)
D. orthogonia (Alexander, 1945)
D. osterhouti (Alexander, 1912)
D. paprzyckii (Alexander, 1941)
D. translucida (Alexander, 1912)
D. xanthomela (Alexander, 1962)
Subgenus Cygnomyia Theischinger, 1994
D. youngoloy (Theischinger, 1994)
Subgenus Dicranomyia Stephens, 1829
D. aberdareica (Alexander, 1956)
D. abigor (Alexander, 1967)
D. abjuncta Alexander, 1927
D. absens Brunetti, 1912
D. acanthophallus Alexander, 1924
D. acerba (Alexander, 1943)
D. acinomeca (Alexander, 1968)
D. acuproducta (Alexander, 1962)
D. adirondacensis Alexander, 1922
D. aegrotans Edwards, 1923
D. aequispina Alexander, 1928
D. affabilis (Alexander, 1952)
D. affinis (Schummel, 1829)
D. agape (Alexander, 1948)
D. alascaensis Alexander, 1919
D. albipennis (Macquart, 1838)
D. albistigma Alexander, 1928
D. albitarsis Alexander, 1915
D. alboapicalis (Alexander, 1929)
D. alfaroi Alexander, 1922
D. alta de Meijere, 1913
D. altandina (Alexander, 1957)
D. ambigua (Alexander, 1929)
D. amblymorpha (Alexander, 1968)
D. amphionis (Alexander, 1952)
D. amplificata (Alexander, 1940)
D. amurensis Alexander, 1925
D. ananta (Alexander, 1964)
D. anax (Alexander, 1942)
D. andicola (Alexander, 1912)
D. andinalta (Alexander, 1957)
D. annulifera Alexander, 1922
D. annulipes Skuse, 1890
D. anteapicalis (Alexander, 1947)
D. aperta Wahlgren, 1904
D. apiceglabra (Alexander, 1968)
D. appa (Theischinger, 1994)
D. apposita (Alexander, 1942)
D. archeyi Alexander, 1924
D. argentina (Alexander, 1912)
D. ariadne (Alexander, 1942)
D. arta (Alexander, 1954)
D. arthuriana Alexander, 1924
D. aspropoda (Alexander, 1965)
D. athabascae Alexander, 1927
D. atrescens Alexander, 1915
D. atritarsis (Alexander, 1949)
D. atropos Savchenko, 1983
D. atrostyla (Alexander, 1942)
D. aurantiothorax (Alexander, 1941)
D. auripennis Skuse, 1890
D. autumnalis (Staeger, 1840)
D. axierasta (Alexander, 1952)
D. baileyana (Alexander, 1963)
D. baileyi Edwards, 1928
D. balli (Theischinger, 1994)
D. basilewskyana (Alexander, 1977) – Basilewsky's cranefly
D. basiseta Alexander, 1924
D. basuto (Alexander, 1956)
D. bethae bethae (Alexander, 1945)
D. bethae contexta (Alexander, 1945)
D. bhima (Alexander, 1965)
D. bhutanica (Alexander, 1942)
D. bickeli (Theischinger, 1996)
D. bicomifera (Alexander, 1943)
D. bidigitata (Alexander, 1958)
D. bigladia (Alexander, 1942)
D. bilobula (Alexander, 1958)
D. boliviana (Alexander, 1930)
D. boniniana (Alexander, 1972)
D. boorana (Theischinger, 1994)
D. borinquenia (Alexander, 1968)
D. boulariensis (Hynes, 1993)
D. brachyneura (Alexander, 1932)
D. brevicubitalis (Alexander, 1947)
D. brevigladia (Alexander, 1962)
D. brevirama Alexander, 1922
D. brevivena Osten Sacken, 1869
D. brevivenula (Alexander, 1929)
D. brookesi Edwards, 1923
D. browni (Alexander, 1932)
D. brunneistigma (Alexander, 1971)
D. bugledichae (Theischinger, 1994)
D. bullockiana (Alexander, 1939)
D. bunyip (Theischinger, 1994)
D. buxtoni Edwards, 1927
D. calianensis (Alexander, 1931)
D. calliergon (Alexander, 1939)
D. candidella (Alexander, 1931)
D. capella (Alexander, 1932)
D. capicola Alexander, 1921
D. catamarcana (Alexander, 1929)
D. cautinensis (Alexander, 1941)
D. cerbereana (Alexander, 1929)
D. cervina Doane, 1908
D. chalybeicolor (Alexander, 1954)
D. chandra (Alexander, 1964)
D. chazeaui (Hynes, 1993)
D. chillcotti (Alexander, 1968)
D. chimborazicola (Alexander, 1946)
D. chimera (Alexander, 1972)
D. chlorotica (Philippi, 1866)
D. chorea (Meigen, 1818)
D. cinctitibia (Alexander, 1934)
D. cinerascens Brunetti, 1912
D. cinerella Alexander, 1923
D. cingulifera Alexander, 1928
D. cinnamonota Alexander, 1921
D. circassica Lackschewitz, 1941
D. citrina Doane, 1900
D. claribasis (Alexander, 1945)
D. clarissima (Alexander, 1967)
D. clarkeana (Alexander, 1970)
D. clarki (Alexander, 1930)
D. clathrata Savchenko, 1984
D. clavigera (Alexander, 1931)
D. clavistyla (Alexander, 1957)
D. clivicola Speiser, 1909
D. clotho (Alexander, 1964)
D. coheri (Alexander, 1964)
D. collita (Alexander, 1978)
D. commina (Alexander, 1967)
D. commixta (Alexander, 1933)
D. complacita (Alexander, 1942)
D. conchifera (Strobl, 1900)
D. confusa Alexander, 1921
D. consimilis (Zetterstedt, 1838)
D. contraria (Alexander, 1953)
D. contristans (Alexander, 1946)
D. conulifera Edwards, 1923
D. convergens de Meijere, 1911
D. convoluta Hancock, 2006
D. coxitalis (Alexander, 1934)
D. cramptoniana (Alexander, 1929)
D. crassispina Alexander, 1923
D. croceiapicalis (Alexander, 1962)
D. cruzi (Alexander, 1936)
D. cuneata Skuse, 1890
D. cuneipennis Alexander, 1923
D. cunninghamensis (Alexander, 1933)
D. dactylophora (Alexander, 1964)
D. dampfi Alexander, 1925
D. davaoensis (Alexander, 1931)
D. defuncta (Osten Sacken, 1860)
D. delicata Brunetti, 1912
D. depauperata Alexander, 1918
D. dibelone (Alexander, 1969)
D. dichroa Savchenko, 1974
D. dicksoniae (Alexander, 1930)
D. didyma (Meigen, 1804)
D. dilanio (Alexander, 1958)
D. dingaan (Alexander, 1960)
D. dissoluta (Alexander, 1929)
D. distans Osten Sacken, 1860
D. distendens Lundstrom, 1912
D. diura (Alexander, 1942)
D. diversigladia (Alexander, 1942)
D. diversispina Alexander, 1923
D. divisa (Alexander, 1929)
D. dolerosa (Alexander, 1931)
D. dorrigensis (Alexander, 1930)
D. dorsalis Skuse, 1890
D. dorsolobata (Alexander, 1946)
D. draupadi (Alexander, 1964)
D. dravidiana (Alexander, 1951)
D. dreisbachi (Alexander, 1965)
D. ebriola (Alexander, 1928)
D. elegantula Alexander, 1913
D. elnora (Alexander, 1929)
D. elquiensis (Blanchard, 1852)
D. empelia (Alexander, 1962)
D. encharis (Alexander, 1964)
D. erichtho (Alexander, 1950)
D. errabunda (Alexander, 1929)
D. erratica (Alexander, 1934)
D. etnurra (Theischinger, 1994)
D. euernes (Alexander, 1964)
D. eulaliae Geiger & Stary, 1994
D. euryrhyncha (Alexander, 1967)
D. evenhuisi (Hynes, 1993)
D. exaeta Alexander, 1927
D. exercita (Alexander, 1929)
D. extranea (Alexander, 1944)
D. falcicula (Alexander, 1962)
D. farri (Alexander, 1964)
D. fasciata Hutton, 1900
D. fata (Theischinger, 1994)
D. fijiana Alexander, 1924
D. filicauda Alexander, 1925
D. flagellata Edwards, 1928
D. flagellifer Alexander, 1928
D. flavaperta (Alexander, 1941)
D. flavida (Philippi, 1866)
D. flavidella (Alexander, 1930)
D. flavigenu Stary & Freidberg, 2007
D. flavobrunnea Brunetti, 1912
D. flavocincta (Brunetti, 1918)
D. flavofascialis Alexander, 1924
D. flavohumeralis (Alexander, 1931)
D. floridana Osten Sacken, 1869
D. fragilis (Theischinger, 1994)
D. francki (Alexander, 1932)
D. fraterna Brunetti, 1912
D. frivola Alexander, 1928
D. frontalis (Staeger, 1840)
D. fugax (Alexander, 1964)
D. fullawayi Alexander, 1915
D. fulva Doane, 1900
D. fulviceps Alexander, 1925
D. fulvinota Alexander, 1923
D. funesta Alexander, 1922
D. furthi Stary & Freidberg, 2007
D. fuscinota Stary, 2009
D. galapagoensis (Alexander, 1962)
D. gardineri Edwards, 1912
D. gemina (Alexander, 1924)
D. gentilis (Alexander, 1950)
D. geronimo (Alexander, 1949)
D. geyserensis (Alexander, 1943)
D. gibbera Alexander, 1916
D. gladiator Osten Sacken, 1860
D. globulicornis Alexander, 1924
D. gloria (Byers, 1994)
D. gloriosa (Alexander, 1912)
D. goana Alexander, 1927
D. goritiensis (Mik, 1864)
D. gracilirostris (Alexander, 1938)
D. gracilis Edwards, 1923
D. grimshawi Alexander, 1919
D. grishma (Alexander, 1964)
D. guamicola (Alexander, 1942)
D. gubernatoria Alexander, 1924
D. guillarmodana (Alexander, 1970)
D. guttata (Philippi, 1866)
D. guttula Alexander, 1915
D. haeretica Osten Sacken, 1869
D. hainaniana (Alexander, 1949)
D. halobia (Tokunaga, 1936)
D. halophila (Alexander, 1929)
D. halterata Osten Sacken, 1869
D. handlirschi Lackschewitz, 1928
D. hardyana (Byers, 1985)
D. harmonia (Alexander, 1956)
D. harpax (Alexander, 1952)
D. hawaiiensis Grimshaw, 1901
D. helmsi Skuse, 1890
D. hemimelas Alexander, 1922
D. heteracantha Alexander, 1923
D. hirsutissima (Alexander, 1962)
D. homichlophila (Alexander, 1958)
D. hostica (Alexander, 1938)
D. hudsoni Edwards, 1923
D. humerosa (Alexander, 1942)
D. humidicola Osten Sacken, 1860
D. hyalinata (Zetterstedt, 1851)
D. idonea Alexander, 1922
D. ignara (Alexander, 1967)
D. illepida (Alexander, 1944)
D. illumina (Alexander, 1958)
D. illustris (Alexander, 1944)
D. imitabilis (Alexander, 1942)
D. immanis (Alexander, 1950)
D. immodesta Osten Sacken, 1860
D. inanis (Alexander, 1934)
D. incisuralis Skuse, 1890
D. incisurata Lackschewitz, 1928
D. incompta (Alexander, 1922)
D. indefensa (Alexander, 1939)
D. indefessa (Alexander, 1965)
D. infensa (Alexander, 1938)
D. infumata (Philippi, 1866)
D. ingrata Alexander, 1928
D. inhabilis (Alexander, 1949)
D. iniquispina (Hardy, 1953)
D. innocens Brunetti, 1912
D. innocua Alexander, 1927
D. inscita (Alexander, 1935)
D. insignifica (Alexander, 1912)
D. insolabilis (Alexander, 1946)
D. insolita (Alexander, 1979)
D. insularis Mik, 1881
D. intermedia Santos Abreu, 1923
D. interrupta (Nielsen, 1966)
D. invalida Alexander, 1916
D. involuta (Alexander, 1968)
D. isabellina Doane, 1900
D. itatiayana (Alexander, 1944)
D. jacobus Alexander, 1919
D. jorgenseni Alexander, 1919
D. jujuyensis Alexander, 1924
D. junctura (Alexander, 1949)
D. kalki (Alexander, 1966)
D. kallakkure (Theischinger, 1994)
D. kamakensis Stary, 1993
D. kandybinae Savchenko, 1987
D. karma (Alexander, 1948)
D. kauaiensis Grimshaw, 1901
D. kaurava (Alexander, 1964)
D. kermadecensis (Alexander, 1973)
D. kernensis (Alexander, 1966)
D. kirishimana Alexander, 1925
D. knabi (Alexander, 1912)
D. kowinka (Theischinger, 1994)
D. koxinga (Alexander, 1930)
D. kraaiensis (Alexander, 1964)
D. kraussi (Alexander, 1951)
D. kubera (Alexander, 1964)
D. kulin (Alexander, 1933)
D. kurnai (Alexander, 1933)
D. kuscheliana (Alexander, 1952)
D. labecula (Alexander, 1942)
D. labellata (Alexander, 1969)
D. lachesis Savchenko, 1983
D. lacroixi Alexander, 1926
D. laffooniana (Alexander, 1948)
D. lagunta (Theischinger, 1994)
D. laistes (Alexander, 1967)
D. lapazensis (Alexander, 1962)
D. lassa (Alexander, 1937)
D. latebra (Alexander, 1967)
D. laticellula (Alexander, 1932)
D. latiflava (Alexander, 1931)
D. latispina (Alexander, 1942)
D. lawrencei (Alexander, 1958)
D. lebombo (Alexander, 1960)
D. lemmonae (Alexander, 1953)
D. leptomera (Alexander, 1972)
D. lethe (Alexander, 1938)
D. lewisi (Alexander, 1964)
D. libertoides (Alexander, 1912)
D. ligayai (Alexander, 1931)
D. limonioides Savchenko, 1974
D. lindsayi Alexander, 1924
D. lineicollis (Blanchard, 1852)
D. linsdalei (Alexander, 1943)
D. livida (Say, 1829)
D. livornica Lackschewitz, 1928
D. loarinna (Theischinger, 1994)
D. longicollis (Macquart, 1846)
D. longipennis (Schummel, 1829)
D. longiunguis Stary & Freidberg, 2007
D. longiventris Alexander, 1913
D. lorettae Geiger, 1985
D. loveridgeana (Alexander, 1962)
D. luaboensis (Alexander, 1960)
D. lucida de Meijere, 1918
D. lugubris de Meijere, 1924
D. lutea (Meigen, 1818)
D. luteiapicalis (Alexander, 1962)
D. luteipennis Goetghebuer, 1920
D. luteipes Alexander, 1923
D. luteitarsis (Alexander, 1965)
D. luteonitens Edwards, 1923
D. lydia (Alexander, 1950)
D. maderensis (Wollaston, 1858)
D. magninota Stary, 2009
D. maligna (Alexander, 1945)
D. malina (Alexander, 1964)
D. malitiosa (Alexander, 1942)
D. marina Skuse, 1890
D. marshalli Alexander, 1920
D. masafuerae (Alexander, 1952)
D. mascarensis Alexander, 1921
D. mattheyi Geiger, 1985
D. mecogastra (Alexander, 1964)
D. megastigmosa Alexander, 1922
D. melanacaena (Alexander, 1970)
D. melanantha Savchenko, 1984
D. melanderi (Alexander, 1945)
D. melanocera Alexander, 1925
D. melanopleura (Alexander, 1931)
D. melanoptera (Alexander, 1934)
D. melina Alexander, 1924
D. memnon (Alexander, 1960)
D. meridicola (Alexander, 1943)
D. mesosternatoides Alexander, 1924
D. michaeli (Theowald, 1977)
D. microentmema (Alexander, 1964)
D. micronychia Lackschewitz, 1941
D. microscola (Alexander, 1967)
D. microsoma (Alexander, 1944)
D. microsomoides (Alexander, 1954)
D. midas (Alexander, 1954)
D. millemurro (Theischinger, 1994)
D. misera Riedel, 1921
D. miseranda (Alexander, 1945)
D. mishimana (Alexander, 1970)
D. mistura (Alexander, 1942)
D. mitis (Meigen, 1830)
D. modesta (Meigen, 1818)
D. moesta Alexander, 1923
D. monilicornis Hutton, 1900
D. moniliformis Doane, 1900
D. monochromera Edwards, 1923
D. monorhaphis (Alexander, 1980)
D. monostromia (Tokunaga, 1930)
D. montium (Alexander, 1929)
D. mosselica (Alexander, 1949)
D. motepa (Theischinger, 1994)
D. muliercula (Alexander, 1942)
D. mulsa Alexander, 1916
D. multispina Alexander, 1922
D. muta (Alexander, 1937)
D. mutata (Alexander, 1935)
D. naga (Alexander, 1964)
D. nairobii Alexander, 1919
D. nakula (Alexander, 1964)
D. namwambae (Alexander, 1956)
D. neabjuncta (Alexander, 1963)
D. neananta (Alexander, 1967)
D. nebulifera Alexander, 1922
D. nefasta (Alexander, 1944)
D. nelsoniana Alexander, 1925
D. neofascipennis (Alexander, 1967)
D. neoguttula (Alexander, 1958)
D. neomidas (Alexander, 1963)
D. neopulchripennis (Alexander, 1940)
D. neopunctulata (Alexander, 1931)
D. nephelia (Alexander, 1978)
D. nephelodes Alexander, 1922
D. nielseniana (Alexander, 1949)
D. nigrescens Hutton, 1900
D. nigritorus (Alexander, 1975)
D. nigrobarbata (Alexander, 1964)
D. nigropolita Alexander, 1923
D. niveifusca (Alexander, 1964)
D. norfolcensis Alexander, 1922
D. nothofagi (Alexander, 1929)
D. novemmaculata (Strobl, 1906)
D. nullanulla (Theischinger, 1994)
D. obscura Skuse, 1890
D. obscuripennis Skuse, 1890
D. obtusiloba (Alexander, 1956)
D. obtusistylus (Alexander, 1925)
D. ochripes (Alexander, 1955)
D. octacantha (Alexander, 1933)
D. ohlini Alexander, 1920
D. omi (Theischinger, 1994)
D. omissa (Alexander, 1912)
D. omissinervis de Meijere, 1918
D. omissivena Alexander, 1922
D. onerosa Alexander, 1928
D. opima Alexander, 1921
D. ornata (Meigen, 1818)
D. ornatipennis (Blanchard, 1852)
D. orthia (Alexander, 1931)
D. orthioides (Alexander, 1932)
D. otagensis Alexander, 1924
D. ovalistigma (Alexander, 1951)
D. ozarkensis (Alexander, 1968)
D. pallidinota Stary, 2009
D. palliditerga (Alexander, 1942)
D. pammelas Alexander, 1925
D. pampoecila Alexander, 1922
D. panthera (Theischinger, 1994)
D. parjanya (Alexander, 1967)
D. particeps Doane, 1908
D. parvati (Alexander, 1967)
D. parvistylata (Alexander, 1960)
D. patens Lundstrom, 1907
D. patricia Stary, 1982
D. patruelis Alexander, 1924
D. paupercula Alexander, 1921
D. pectinunguis (Tokunaga, 1940)
D. pedestris (Alexander, 1952)
D. pelates (Alexander, 1962)
D. penana (Alexander, 1957)
D. pendulifera Alexander, 1923
D. pennifera (Alexander, 1945)
D. penrissenensis Edwards, 1926
D. pentadactyla (Alexander, 1964)
D. peralta (Alexander, 1946)
D. perdistalis (Alexander, 1943)
D. perdocta (Alexander, 1954)
D. perexcelsior (Alexander, 1962)
D. perflaveola (Alexander, 1927)
D. peringueyi Alexander, 1917
D. perpulchra (Alexander, 1928)
D. perpuncticosta (Alexander, 1950)
D. perretracta (Alexander, 1942)
D. perserena (Alexander, 1946)
D. pertruncata (Alexander, 1962)
D. perturbata (Alexander, 1978)
D. phalaris (Alexander, 1956)
D. phatta (Philippi, 1866)
D. picticauda (Alexander, 1979)
D. pictithorax Alexander, 1923
D. pietatis (Alexander, 1943)
D. pinodes (Alexander, 1929)
D. pitoa (Theischinger, 1994)
D. pleurilineata Riedel, 1917
D. pluricomata (Alexander, 1964)
D. plurispina Alexander, 1925
D. pluvialis (Alexander, 1929)
D. poli (Alexander, 1941)
D. polysticta (Philippi, 1866)
D. polystonyx (Alexander, 1968)
D. pontica Lackschewitz, 1941
D. pontophila (Tokunaga, 1940)
D. posticanivea (Alexander, 1978)
D. praecellens (Alexander, 1944)
D. praepostera Alexander, 1925
D. praevia (Alexander, 1952)
D. primaeva (Alexander, 1929)
D. profunda Alexander, 1925
D. prolixistyla (Alexander, 1981)
D. pudica Osten Sacken, 1860
D. pudicoides (Alexander, 1930)
D. pulchripennis Brunetti, 1912
D. puncticosta Brunetti, 1912
D. punctipennis Skuse, 1890
D. punctulata de Meijere, 1911
D. punctulatella (Alexander, 1933)
D. punctulatina (Alexander, 1960)
D. punctulatoides (Alexander, 1932)
D. punoensis (Alexander, 1946)
D. quadrigladia (Alexander, 1944)
D. quadrituberculata (Alexander, 1937)
D. quinquenotata (Brunetti, 1918)
D. radegasti Stary, 1993
D. rapida (Alexander, 1946)
D. ravana (Alexander, 1964)
D. ravida Alexander, 1925
D. rectidens (Alexander, 1934)
D. rectistyla (Alexander, 1967)
D. recurvistyla (Alexander, 1975)
D. reductissima (Alexander, 1952)
D. redundans (Alexander, 1956)
D. regifica Alexander, 1916
D. remota Skuse, 1890
D. repanda Edwards, 1923
D. repentina (Alexander, 1929)
D. reticulata (Alexander, 1912)
D. retrusa (Alexander, 1930)
D. reversalis Alexander, 1922
D. rhinoceros (Alexander, 1945)
D. rixosa (Alexander, 1964)
D. rodriguensis Edwards, 1923
D. rostrifera Osten Sacken, 1869
D. rostrotruncata (Alexander, 1979)
D. rudra (Alexander, 1960)
D. sabroskyana (Byers, 1982)
D. sanctaecruzae Alexander, 1920
D. sanctaehelenae (Alexander, 1962)
D. sanctigeorgii Edwards, 1927
D. satura (Alexander, 1956)
D. saxatilis Skuse, 1890
D. saxemarina (Alexander, 1937)
D. scelio (Alexander, 1965)
D. schindleri (Alexander, 1962)
D. schmidiana (Alexander, 1975)
D. scimitar (Alexander, 1942)
D. seducta Alexander, 1923
D. selkirki Alexander, 1920
D. semantica (Alexander, 1932)
D. semicuneata Alexander, 1924
D. seposita (Alexander, 1929)
D. sera (Walker, 1848)
D. serratiloba (Alexander, 1950)
D. shelfordi (Alexander, 1944)
D. shinanoensis (Alexander, 1933)
D. shirakii Alexander, 1923
D. sibyllina (Alexander, 1929)
D. sielediva (Alexander, 1960)
D. signata de Meijere, 1919
D. signatella Stary & Freidberg, 2007
D. simillima (Alexander, 1912)
D. simulans (Walker, 1848)
D. skanda (Alexander, 1964)
D. smythiana (Alexander, 1942)
D. snelli (Edwards, 1934)
D. sparsa Alexander, 1924
D. sparsituber (Alexander, 1962)
D. sperata Alexander, 1922
D. spinosissima Geiger & Stary, 1994
D. splendidula (Alexander, 1930)
D. sponsa Alexander, 1922
D. sternolobatoides (Alexander, 1964)
D. stigmata Doane, 1900
D. strobli Pagast, 1941
D. stuardoi (Alexander, 1952)
D. stulta Osten Sacken, 1860
D. stygipennis Alexander, 1919
D. subalbitarsis (Alexander, 1930)
D. subandicola (Alexander, 1947)
D. subandina (Alexander, 1913)
D. subchlorotica (Alexander, 1969)
D. subconfusa (Alexander, 1958)
D. subdichroa Savchenko, 1974
D. subdidyma (Alexander, 1975)
D. subdola Alexander, 1913
D. subfasciata Alexander, 1924
D. subfascipennis Brunetti, 1912
D. subflavida (Alexander, 1929)
D. sublimis (Alexander, 1932)
D. submarina (Theischinger, 1994)
D. submidas (Alexander, 1956)
D. submulsa (Alexander, 1971)
D. submutata (Alexander, 1942)
D. suborthia (Alexander, 1932)
D. subpulchripennis (Alexander, 1931)
D. subpunctulata (Alexander, 1930)
D. subravida Alexander, 1928
D. subredundans (Alexander, 1975)
D. subremota Alexander, 1922
D. subreticulata (Alexander, 1943)
D. subsordida Edwards, 1928
D. substricta Alexander, 1928
D. subtristoides (Alexander, 1945)
D. subviridis Alexander, 1922
D. sulphuralis Edwards, 1923
D. suspensa (Alexander, 1933)
D. swezeyana (Alexander, 1942)
D. swezeyi Alexander, 1919
D. synclera Alexander, 1927
D. tahanensis Edwards, 1928
D. takeuchii Alexander, 1922
D. tamsi (Edwards, 1934)
D. tapleyi Alexander, 1924
D. tarsalba Alexander, 1922
D. teinoterga (Alexander, 1967)
D. tenebrosa Edwards, 1923
D. tenuiclava (Alexander, 1932)
D. tenuicula (Alexander, 1929)
D. tenuifilamentosa (Alexander, 1945)
D. terebrina Alexander, 1921
D. terraenovae Alexander, 1920
D. tessulata (Savchenko, 1974)
D. thamyris (Alexander, 1950)
D. thetica (Alexander, 1932)
D. thixis (Alexander, 1967)
D. tinctipennis de Meijere, 1916
D. tipulipes Karsch, 1886
D. titicacana (Alexander, 1945)
D. tongensis (Alexander, 1978)
D. torpida (Alexander, 1948)
D. torrens Alexander, 1923
D. torulosa (Alexander, 1968)
D. transfuga (Alexander, 1935)
D. tremula (Alexander, 1931)
D. tricholabis Edwards, 1926
D. tricuspidata (Alexander, 1936)
D. tricuspis Alexander, 1923
D. trifilamentosa (Alexander, 1932)
D. trilobifera (Alexander, 1967)
D. trilobula (Alexander, 1958)
D. trinitatis (Alexander, 1931)
D. trispinula (Alexander, 1933)
D. tristigmata Alexander, 1925
D. tristina (Alexander, 1930)
D. trituberculata (Alexander, 1929)
D. troglophila (Alexander, 1929)
D. tyrranica (Alexander, 1964)
D. uinta (Alexander, 1948)
D. umbonis (Alexander, 1964)
D. umkomazanae (Alexander, 1956)
D. ungjeeburra (Theischinger, 1994)
D. unicinctifera (Alexander, 1930)
D. unispinosa Alexander, 1921
D. upoluensis Edwards, 1928
D. ushas (Alexander, 1965)
D. vaccha (Alexander, 1966)
D. validistyla (Alexander, 1933)
D. vamana (Alexander, 1952)
D. variabilis Grimshaw, 1901
D. variispina Alexander, 1924
D. varsha (Alexander, 1967)
D. veda (Alexander, 1966)
D. venatrix (Alexander, 1952)
D. veneris (Alexander, 1952)
D. ventralis (Schummel, 1829)
D. venusta Bergroth, 1888
D. venustior (Alexander, 1950)
D. veternosa (Alexander, 1935)
D. viator (Alexander, 1960)
D. vicarians (Schiner, 1868)
D. vicina (Macquart, 1839)
D. villaricae (Alexander, 1929)
D. virilis Alexander, 1916
D. vulgata Bergroth, 1888
D. waitakeriae (Alexander, 1952)
D. walleyi (Alexander, 1943)
D. wattamolla (Theischinger, 1994)
D. weiseriana (Alexander, 1929)
D. weschei Edwards, 1923
D. whiteae (Alexander, 1941)
D. whitei Alexander, 1921
D. wilfredi (Alexander, 1952)
D. willamettensis (Alexander, 1949)
D. williamsae (Theischinger, 1994)
D. wiseana (Alexander, 1956)
D. woggoon (Theischinger, 1994)
D. wundurra (Theischinger, 1994)
D. yaksha (Alexander, 1964)
D. yerrawar (Theischinger, 1994)
D. yoganidra (Alexander, 1967)
D. ypsilon (Alexander, 1959)
D. yunqueana (Alexander, 1952)
D. zernyi Lackschewitz, 1928
D. zonata Skuse, 1890
Subgenus Doaneomyia Alexander, 1921
D. altitarsis (Edwards, 1927)
D. caledoniensis (Alexander, 1948)
D. deprivata (Alexander, 1948)
D. fijicola (Alexander, 1953)
D. pampangensis (Alexander, 1931)
D. tahitiensis (Alexander, 1921)
Subgenus Erostrata Savchenko, 1976
D. canis (Alexander, 1931)
D. cnephosa (Alexander, 1959)
D. cynotis (Alexander, 1931)
D. globithorax Osten Sacken, 1869
D. melas (Alexander, 1934)
D. tabashii (Alexander, 1934)
Subgenus Euglochina Alexander, 1921
D. arachnobia (Alexander, 1929)
D. bulbibasis (Alexander, 1972)
D. captiosa (Alexander, 1932)
D. comoroensis (Alexander, 1959)
D. connectans Alexander, 1920
D. curtata (Alexander, 1935)
D. curtivena Alexander, 1922
D. dignitosa (Alexander, 1931)
D. dravidica (Alexander, 1951)
D. fuscibasis Alexander, 1922
D. invocata (Alexander, 1948)
D. novaeguineae de Meijere, 1915
D. okinawensis Alexander, 1925
D. projecta (Alexander, 1929)
D. saltens (Doleschall, 1857)
D. silens (Alexander, 1948)
Subgenus Glochina Meigen, 1830
D. bangerteri (Mendl, 1974)
D. basifusca Alexander, 1919
D. brevispina Savchenko, 1976
D. cretica Mendl, 1979
D. hansiana Stary & Geiger, 1985
D. illingworthi Alexander, 1914
D. kaszabi (Mannheims & Savchenko, 1973)
D. kinensis (Alexander, 1936)
D. liberta Osten Sacken, 1860
D. mediterranea Lackschewitz, 1942
D. pauli Geiger, 1983
D. perobtusa (Alexander, 1945)
D. persordida Savchenko, 1976
D. schineriana (Alexander, 1964)
D. sericata (Meigen, 1830)
D. sordida brevicula (Alexander, 1934)
D. sordida sordida Brunetti, 1912
D. sordidipennis (Alexander, 1940)
D. staryi Geiger & Mendl, 1994
D. transsilvanica Lackschewitz, 1928
D. tristis (Schummel, 1829)
D. tristoides (Alexander, 1929)
Subgenus Hesperolimonia Alexander, 1966
D. infuscata Doane, 1900
Subgenus Idioglochina Alexander, 1921
D. allani (Alexander, 1959)
D. ambrosiana (Alexander, 1962)
D. australiensis Alexander, 1922
D. bioculata (de Meijere, 1916)
D. chlorella (Alexander, 1978)
D. corallicola (Alexander, 1956)
D. debeauforti de Meijere, 1913
D. flavalis (Alexander, 1934)
D. fumipennis (Butler, 1875)
D. kotoshoensis Alexander, 1923
D. kronei Mik, 1881
D. latibasis (Alexander, 1967)
D. lightfooti Alexander, 1917
D. marmorata Osten Sacken, 1861
D. medidorsalis (Tokunaga, 1936)
D. obesula Edwards, 1927
D. pacifica (Tokunaga, 1935)
D. parvimacula Edwards, 1927
D. perkinsiana (Alexander, 1930)
D. porteri Alexander, 1919
D. tokara (Nobuchi, 1955)
D. tokunagai (Alexander, 1932)
D. tokunagana (Alexander, 1964)
D. tusitala (Alexander, 1921)
D. vilae Edwards, 1927
Subgenus Idiopyga Savchenko, 1987
D. alpina Bangerter, 1948
D. ctenopyga (Alexander, 1943)
D. danica Kuntze, 1919
D. esbeni (Nielsen, 1940)
D. flabellifera Byers & Rossman, 2008
D. grahamiana (Alexander, 1933)
D. halterella Edwards, 1921
D. intricata Alexander, 1927
D. klefbecki (Tjeder, 1941)
D. lackschewitzi Edwards, 1928
D. lulensis (Tjeder, 1969)
D. magnicauda Lundstrom, 1912
D. megacauda Alexander, 1924
D. melleicauda Alexander, 1917
D. murina (Zetterstedt, 1851)
D. nigristigma Nielsen, 1919
D. piscataquis (Alexander, 1941)
D. ponojensis Lundstrom, 1912
D. retrograda (Alexander, 1941)
D. sternolobata (Alexander, 1936)
D. stigmatica (Meigen, 1830)
D. tseni (Alexander, 1938)
D. violovitshi Savchenko, 1974
Subgenus Melanolimonia Alexander, 1965
D. aurita (Alexander, 1929)
D. azorica (Nielsen, 1963)
D. benguetensis (Alexander, 1931)
D. caledonica Edwards, 1926
D. emodi (Alexander, 1960)
D. evexa (Alexander, 1967)
D. fulvomorio (Edwards, 1933)
D. fulvonigrina (Alexander, 1965)
D. hamata Becker, 1908
D. kansuensis (Alexander, 1930)
D. kongosana (Alexander, 1934)
D. lakshmi (Alexander, 1958)
D. latemarginata (Alexander, 1972)
D. monkhtuyae Podenas & Gelhaus, 2001
D. morio (Fabricius, 1787)
D. morioides Osten Sacken, 1860
D. moronis (Alexander, 1932)
D. neomorio Alexander, 1927
D. nesomorio Alexander, 1928
D. nigrithorax Brunetti, 1912
D. nitidithorax Senior-White, 1922
D. nycteris Alexander, 1927
D. occidua Edwards, 1926
D. pacifera (Alexander, 1937)
D. paramorio Alexander, 1926
D. parviloba (Alexander, 1940)
D. parvincisa (Alexander, 1940)
D. penita (Alexander, 1936)
D. pernigrita (Alexander, 1965)
D. priapula (Alexander, 1966)
D. pseudomorio Alexander, 1920
D. rhadinostyla (Alexander, 1967)
D. rufiventris (Strobl, 1900)
D. spinifera Alexander, 1927
D. stylifera Lackschewitz, 1928
D. subaurita (Alexander, 1938)
D. submorio Alexander, 1920
D. tergotruncata (Alexander, 1966)
Subgenus Nealexandriaria Alexander, 1967
D. anisota (Alexander, 1973)
D. argyrata (Alexander, 1929)
D. atayal (Alexander, 1929)
D. atromaculata Edwards, 1928
D. brevissima Alexander, 1925
D. carneotincta Alexander, 1915
D. cinereicapilla (Alexander, 1934)
D. conveniens (Walker, 1848)
D. diengana (Alexander, 1931)
D. frontina (Edwards, 1933)
D. fulvicolor (Alexander, 1973)
D. injucunda (Alexander, 1967)
D. ludmilla (Theischinger, 1994)
D. milkurli (Theischinger, 1994)
D. nathalinae (Alexander, 1932)
D. nigroephippiata (Alexander, 1952)
D. ochricapilla (Alexander, 1956)
D. prominens Brunetti, 1918
D. scolopia (Alexander, 1971)
D. semirufa Edwards, 1927
D. simplissima Alexander, 1915
D. sollicita (Alexander, 1931)
D. tecta (Alexander, 1932)
D. tenella de Meijere, 1911
D. unibrunnea (Alexander, 1945)
Subgenus Neoglochina Alexander, 1967
D. aurigena (Alexander, 1944)
D. capnora Alexander, 1921
D. curraniana (Alexander, 1944)
D. esau (Alexander, 1947)
D. felix (Alexander, 1950)
D. fumosa (Alexander, 1912)
D. grossa (Alexander, 1938)
D. imperturbata (Alexander, 1951)
D. infucata (Alexander, 1927)
D. ingens (Alexander, 1945)
D. insulicola Oosterbroek, 2009.
D. leucoscelis (Alexander, 1950)
D. limbinervis (Alexander, 1941)
D. lutzi (Alexander, 1912)
D. mesotricha (Alexander, 1944)
D. moniligera (Alexander, 1967)
D. multisignata (Alexander, 1936)
D. pernobilis (Alexander, 1941)
D. praeclara (Alexander, 1928)
D. sciasma (Alexander, 1950)
D. trialbocincta (Alexander, 1941)
Subgenus Neolimnobia Alexander, 1928
D. anthracopoda (Alexander, 1938)
D. archangelica (Alexander, 1942)
D. corallina (Alexander, 1938)
D. diva (Schiner, 1868)
D. excelsior (Alexander, 1944)
D. hypocrita (Alexander, 1935)
D. immaculipes (Alexander, 1935)
D. latiorflava (Alexander, 1979)
D. muscosa Enderlein, 1912
D. pugilis (Alexander, 1943)
D. stygicornis (Alexander, 1962)
D. tricincta Alexander, 1913
Subgenus Nesciomyia Theischinger, 1994
D. durroon (Theischinger, 1994)
Subgenus Numantia Bigot, 1854
D. fusca (Meigen, 1804)
Subgenus Pandamyia Theischinger, 1994
D. nowankareena (Theischinger, 1994)
D. uckillya (Theischinger, 1994)
Subgenus Peripheroptera Schiner, 1868
D. aberrans (Schiner, 1868)
D. angustifasciata (Alexander, 1922)
D. arcuata (Alexander, 1913)
D. atrosignata (Alexander, 1934)
D. auranticolor (Alexander, 1978)
D. austroandina (Alexander, 1929)
D. cochabambae (Alexander, 1945)
D. croceibasis (Alexander, 1942)
D. cynara (Alexander, 1942)
D. dis (Alexander, 1944)
D. eudorae (Alexander, 1913)
D. euryptera (Alexander, 1953)
D. fulvistigma (Alexander, 1953)
D. fumibasalis (Alexander, 1937)
D. fuscoanalis (Alexander, 1979)
D. glochinoides (Alexander, 1922)
D. incommoda (Osten Sacken, 1888)
D. incommodes (Alexander, 1928)
D. lankesteri (Alexander, 1946)
D. lichyella (Alexander, 1947)
D. lissomelania (Alexander, 1967)
D. machupichuana (Alexander, 1953)
D. morgana (Alexander, 1944)
D. nearcuata (Alexander, 1940)
D. nitens (Schiner, 1868)
D. ordinaria (Alexander, 1945)
D. parvistigmata (Alexander, 1980)
D. peramoena (Alexander, 1945)
D. perdelecta (Alexander, 1940)
D. prindlei (Alexander, 1938)
D. rediviva (Alexander, 1942)
D. rhoda (Alexander, 1939)
D. schineri (Osten Sacken, 1888)
D. subamoena (Alexander, 1942)
D. teucholaboides (Alexander, 1913)
D. thioptera (Alexander, 1941)
D. trimelania (Alexander, 1942)
D. trinigrina (Alexander, 1940)
D. vivasberthieri (Alexander, 1940)
Subgenus Pseudoglochina Alexander, 1921
D. angustapicalis (Alexander, 1931)
D. apicialba (Alexander, 1965)
D. bicinctipes Brunetti, 1912
D. bilatior (Alexander, 1932)
D. bilatissima (Alexander, 1932)
D. biluteola (Alexander, 1950)
D. bryophila (Alexander, 1934)
D. dimelania (Alexander, 1935)
D. eurymelania (Alexander, 1965)
D. evanescens (Alexander, 1936)
D. fuscolata (Alexander, 1936)
D. hoskingi (Alexander, 1935)
D. kobusi de Meijere, 1904
D. laticincta (Edwards, 1928)
D. microneura (Alexander, 1948)
D. monocycla (Alexander, 1935)
D. pamela (Alexander, 1960)
D. periscelis (Alexander, 1958)
D. pictipes Brunetti, 1918
D. ponapensis (Alexander, 1940)
D. procella (Alexander, 1936)
D. pulchripes (Alexander, 1920)
D. querula (Alexander, 1937)
D. riukiuensis (Alexander, 1929)
D. unicinctipes (Alexander, 1929)
Subgenus Sivalimnobia Alexander, 1963
D. alticola Edwards, 1916
D. approximata Brunetti, 1912
D. aquosa Verrall, 1886
D. bicolor Brunetti, 1918
D. clavula (Alexander, 1972)
D. euphileta (Alexander, 1924)
D. excelsa Alexander, 1915
D. fortis Brunetti, 1912
D. kali (Alexander, 1963)
D. marginella (Alexander, 1929)
D. nongkodjadjarensis de Meijere, 1913
D. pererratica (Alexander, 1973)
D. pleiades (Alexander, 1931)
D. rahula (Alexander, 1963)
D. uma (Alexander, 1967)
Subgenus Zalusa Enderlein, 1906
D. falklandica (Enderlein, 1906)
Subgenus Zelandoglochina Alexander, 1924
D. angelica (Alexander, 1929)
D. aphanta (Alexander, 1929)
D. atrovittata Alexander, 1922
D. bigoti (Alexander, 1913)
D. canterburiana Alexander, 1923
D. circularis Alexander, 1924
D. crassipes Edwards, 1923
D. cubitalis Edwards, 1923
D. decincta Edwards, 1923
D. fagetorum (Alexander, 1929)
D. flabellifera (Alexander, 1929)
D. flavidipennis Edwards, 1923
D. harrisi Alexander, 1923
D. huttoni Edwards, 1923
D. laterospina Alexander, 1924
D. melanogramma Edwards, 1923
D. miniata (Alexander, 1929)
D. multiarmata (Alexander, 1929)
D. multinodosa (Alexander, 1929)
D. myersi Alexander, 1924
D. nodulifera (Alexander, 1929)
D. nubleana (Alexander, 1971)
D. octava Edwards, 1923
D. ofella (Alexander, 1953)
D. omissistyla (Alexander, 1929)
D. paradisea  Alexander, 1923
D. parvispinosa (Alexander, 1929)
D. pervincta (Alexander, 1936)
D. pilosipennis (Alexander, 1929)
D. setulipennis (Alexander, 1929)
D. sublacteata Edwards, 1923
D. tehuelche (Alexander, 1929)
D. tenuipalpis (Alexander, 1929)
D. torticornis (Alexander, 1929)
D. unicornis Alexander, 1923
D. unijuga Alexander, 1923
Uncertain Placement
D. erythrina Alexander, 1915
D. nelliana Alexander, 1914
D. scutellumnigrum Alexander, 1920
D. tamarae Alexander, 1919

References

Limoniidae
Nematocera genera